Aperibé is a municipality located in the Brazilian state of Rio de Janeiro. Its population was 11,901 (2020) and its area is 89 km².

References

Municipalities in Rio de Janeiro (state)